The Fort Sage Mountains are a mountain range running across the state borders in western Washoe County, Nevada and eastern Lassen County, California.

References 

Mountain ranges of Nevada
Mountain ranges of Northern California
Mountain ranges of Washoe County, Nevada
Mountain ranges of Lassen County, California